AT Brand is a European project co-financed by the European Regional Development Fund (ERDF), Interreg Atlantic Area IVB supporting transnational co-operation projects in Atlantic regions. From 1 January 2014 through September 2015 the project focused on innovation and management in integrated city branding.

INTERREG Atlantic Area IVB programme 

This programme is the fourth transnational co-operation programme in the area. It aims to contribute to the territorial cohesion of the Atlantic Area. Regional Cooperation is carried out by common strategy actions and the exchange of know-how.

INTERREG Atlantic Area encloses, 27 co-operation areas from five countries (United Kingdom, Ireland, France, Spain and Portugal). Since centuries ago they share a strong cultural identity, history and heritage (including the Celtic dimension: Ireland, Scotland, Wales, Cornwall, Brittany, Asturias, and Galicia), as well as a similar geographical and maritime environment.

Purpose of the project

Partners 
The project is led by Dublin City Council. The five partners are the Faro, San Sebastián, the Agglomeration community of La Rochelle, Liverpool Vision, and the Conference of Atlantic Arc Cities. Other cities and institutions are also invited to share the project.

Integrated city branding strategy 

City branding is understood by partners as a complete and human communication strategy. The ATBRAND approach is innovative, as it takes all communication dimensions on board. 
ATBRAND is not producing traditional logos and slogans, as cities are not products.
Cities have to communicate their brand narrative globally, including local stakeholders, to reach a sustainable strategy: “the story is the unique branding mark that each city has drawn from history and experience".

Objectives 
In accordance with the INTERREG IVB ATLANTIC AREA priority that supports transnational projects working together for sustainable urban and regional development, the AT Brand strategic objective is to make cities and regions more influential and attractive through networking. "The project ATBRAND intends to explore the feasibility of a long-term strategy to co-brand the Atlantic area". It capitalises on city networking, best practices in place branding and past initiatives, counting on citizens' opinions. The aim is to make cities located in the Atlantic Arc more visible and attractive.

The actions to reach these objectives include: 
 a cross-learning programme of progressive city-brand management 
 innovative pilot actions at local level with high potential for transferability 
 a web-based toolkit for the Atlantic brand, highlighting core brand messaging 
 creating a draft roadmap for co-branding the Atlantic area

Activities

Workshops 
Workshops are international meetings where cities come together to define their communication strategy. The first was in Dublin, so as to launch the project, in February 2014. The second was in Liverpool, so to reflect on city brand building: politics of city representation, in June 2014. The third was held in La Rochelle, working on the city brand governance: shaping the collaboration model, in December 2014. The fourth was in San Sebastian, talking about the actions of communication in city branding and marketing, in April 2015. The final workshop will take place in Dublin in September 2015.

Pilot projects 
Each participating city has its own pilot project. Dublin is working on a digital platform. La Rochelle and Faro are working on their Territorial Marketing Strategies. San Sebastian aims to position itself as a City of Innovation. Cardiff seeks to be known outside the city by people living in the city. Liverpool's pilot project is called It's Liverpool.

External links

References

Promotion and marketing communications
European Union